"Let a Smile Be Your Umbrellas" is a popular song.

The music was written by Sammy Fain, the lyrics by Irving Kahal and Francis Wheeler. The song was published in 1927 and was the first collaboration between the Fain / Kahal team. Successful early recordings were made by Roger Wolfe Kahn (vocal by Franklyn Baur) and by Sam Lanin (vocal by Irving Kaufman), and these both reached the charts of the day in 1928.

Other notable recordings
1928 Lee Morse and Her Bluegrass Boys - recorded for Columbia Records on January 23, 1928.
1949 The Andrews Sisters
1950 Jimmy Dorsey and His Original "Dorseyland" Jazz Band – included in the album Dorseyland Dance Parade, vocal by Claire "Shanty" Hogan.
1957 Bing Crosby included the song in his album Bing with a Beat.
1959 Perry Como - recorded for his album Como Swings.
1965 Bert Kaempfert and His Orchestra – included in their album Love Letters.

Film appearances
1929 It's a Great Life - performed by unseen male singer in the theater.
1932 The song is used in the Van Beuren cartoon The Wild Goose Chase.
1948 Give My Regards to Broadway

Homage

 The song's title is referenced in the 1962 Academy Award-nominated animated short Disney musical film, A Symposium on Popular Songs during the song, "Although I Dropped $100,000" written by Robert & Richard Sherman.
 A 1974 Sesame Street record spoofs the song as "Let a Frown Be Your Umbrella," containing a song of the same name sung by Oscar the Grouch.
 The song's title was referenced in Twin Peaks, season 2 episode 11, when Agent Dale Cooper is given advice paraphrasing the song's title, by his supervisor Agent Gordon Cole.
 Joey Reynolds's autobiography is titled Let a Smile Be Your Umbrella, but Don't Get a Mouthful of Rain.

References

1927 songs
Songs with music by Sammy Fain
Songs with lyrics by Irving Kahal